Wicked Witch Software is an Australian video game developer that was founded in 2001 by Daniel Visser, the managing director. Wicked Witch Software has produced 50 or more games across platforms such as Android, iOS, PlayStation, Xbox, Nintendo, and Steam.

Wicked Witch Software has provided work for local and international developers and publishers, including Microsoft, Torus, Krome, and Tru Blu.

History 
Following the PC game “Space Chimps”, Wicked Witch Software worked on two Nintendo DS action-adventure titles: NRL’s “Mascot Mania” and AFL's “Mascot Manor”, both released in 2009.

In 2014, Mattel and Wicked Witch Software developed and released an iOS game based on Whac-A-Mole. Wicked Witch developed and Tru Blu released AFL Live 2 for PlayStation 3 and Xbox 360 and rugby titles Rugby League Live 2 Gold (NRL) and Jonah Lomu Rugby Gold Rugby Union for iOS and Android.

In 2019, Wicked Witch Software collaborated on Microsoft's Age of Empires II: Definitive Edition remaster. Developed by Forgotten Empires, Tantalus, and Wicked Witch Software, Age of Empires II: Definitive Edition included new content and gameplay.

Wicked Witch Software developed and Tru Blu published the AFL Evolution series, with AFL Evolution 2 being released across consoles and PC in 2020.

Wicked Witch Software developed and Tru Blu published Rugby Challenge titles under the Rugby Union license. Rugby Challenge 4 was released  in 2020.

Games

References

External links 
 

2021 mergers and acquisitions
Australian companies established in 2001
Australian subsidiaries of foreign companies
Companies based in Melbourne
Keywords Studios
Video game companies established in 2001
Video game companies of Australia
Video game development companies